China Jinmao Holdings Group Limited, the subsidiary of state-owned Sinochem Corporation, is engaged in real estate development in Shanghai, Beijing and Zhuhai. It is incorporated and headquartered in Hong Kong, but its business is mainly in Mainland China. The formerly name was "Franshion Properties (China) Limited".

It was listed on the Hong Kong Stock Exchange on 17 August 2007. It joined Hang Seng China-Affiliated Corporations Index Constitute Stock (red chip) on 10 March 2008.

See also
Real estate in China

External links
chinajinmao.cn

Sinochem Group
Companies listed on the Hong Kong Stock Exchange
Government-owned companies of China
Real estate companies of Hong Kong
Real estate companies established in 2004